The Pleurodira are one of the two living suborders of turtles, the other being the Cryptodira. The division between these two suborders represents a very deep evolutionary divide between two very different types of turtles. The physical differences between them, although anatomical and largely internal, are nonetheless significant, and the zoogeographic implications of them are substantial. The Pleurodira are known more commonly as the side-necked turtles and the name Pleurodira quite literally translates to side neck, whereas the Cryptodira are known as hidden-necked turtles. The Pleurodira turtles are currently restricted to freshwater habitats in the Southern Hemisphere, largely to Australia, South America, and Africa. Within the Pleurodira, three living families are represented: Chelidae, also known as the Austro-South American side-necked turtles, the Pelomedusidae, also known as the African mud terrapins, and the Podocnemididae, also known as the American side-neck river turtles. However, they were cosmopolitan clade during the Cretaceous and most of the Cenozoic, and even occurred in marine environments around the world.

Definition and description 
The Pleurodira are identified by the method with which they withdraw their heads into their shells. In these turtles, the neck is bent in the horizontal plane, drawing the head into a space in front of one of the front legs. A larger overhang of the carapace helps to protect the neck, which remains partially exposed after retraction. This differs from the method employed by a cryptodiran, which tucks its head and neck between its forelegs, within the shell.

The different methods of bending the neck require completely different anatomies of the cervical vertebrae. All extant turtles studied so far have eight vertebrae in the neck. In the Pleurodira, these vertebrae are narrow in cross-section and spool-shaped with biconvex centra on one or more of the cervicals. These centra act as a double joint, allowing a large degree of sideways movement and providing a means of folding the neck onto itself in the lateral plane. Conversely, in the Cryptodira, the neck bones are wide and flat. The biconvex centra in some of the cryptodiran cervicals allow the neck to fold onto itself in the vertical plane.

Pleurodirans also differ from cryptodirans in the emarginations of their skulls. Skull emargination provides room and anchorage for the jaw muscles. The connection points and the position of the emarginations relate to different bones of the skull.

Another difference is in the arrangement of the bones of the shell and the scutes overlaying them. Pleurodiran turtles have 13 scutes on the plastron of the shell, whereas cryptodiran turtles have only 12. The extra scute is called the intergular and is at the front of the plastron between the gular scutes. Pelomedusid turtles also possess mesoplastra, further differentiating this group.

Suction feeding
One of the three extant families in this suborder is the family Chelidae, which have a specially adapted strategy for catching prey. While the majority of the family Chelidae are omnivores there are 17 species that are carnivores; Chelus fimbriatus and species of the Chelodina genus. This special strategy is referred to as a gape-suck mechanism. The turtle first opens its mouth little by little. Then, when the turtle is within striking range of the prey, it will open its mouth completely sucking in water at such a rate that the current into its mouth is too strong for prey to escape and it engulfs the prey within 0.004 seconds. This strategy also circumvents issues to quick capture of underwater prey, such as resistance to rapid movement in water, pressure waves due to a rapid strike, and rapid water intake when feeding.

Taxonomy

After Ferreria, et al. 2018.
 Panpleurodira
†Dortokidae (extinct) (Early Cretaceous-Paleocene)
†Platychelyidae (extinct) (Late Jurassic-Early Cretaceous)
Pleurodira
Chelidae
Pan-Pelomedusoides
†Araripemydidae (extinct) (Early Cretaceous)
†Euraxemydidae (extinct)
Pelomedusoides
Pelomedusidae
†Peiropemydidae (extinct)
†Atolchelys (extinct) (Early Cretaceous)
†Sahonachelyidae (extinct) (Late Cretaceous)
Podocnemididae
 †Bothremydidae (extinct) (Early Cretaceous-Miocene)

References

 
Taxa named by Edward Drinker Cope
Tetrapod suborders